Frøya is the westernmost municipality in Trøndelag county, Norway. It is part of the Fosen region and consists of the island of Frøya, which lies north of the island of Hitra, as well several thousand other small islands surrounding the island of Frøya. The village of Sistranda is the administrative center of Frøya. Other villages include Hammarvika, Titran, Sula, and Mausund. The main island of Frøya is connected to the neighboring island of Hitra (and ultimately the mainland of Norway) by the Frøya Tunnel which goes under the Frøyfjorden.

The  municipality is the 291st largest by area out of the 356 municipalities in Norway. Frøya is the 176th most populous municipality in Norway with a population of 5,265.

General information

The parish of Frøya was established as a municipality on 1 January 1877 when it was separated from the municipality of Hitra. Its initial population was 3,949. On 1 January 1906, it was split into two municipalities: Nord-Frøya in the north and Sør-Frøya in the south. During the 1960s, there were many municipal mergers across Norway due to the work of the Schei Committee. On 1 January 1964, Nord-Frøya and Sør-Frøya were merged back together again, forming a new municipality of Frøya.  On 1 January 2018, the municipality switched from the old Sør-Trøndelag county to the new Trøndelag county.

Name
The name of the island and municipality come from Norse mythology. Although Frøya is a variant of the name of the Norse goddess Freyja, the Old Norse form of the name of the island was Frøy or Frey (the ending -a in the modern form is actually the feminine definite article - so the meaning of Frøya is 'the Frøy'). Therefore, the name of the island probably has the same root as the name of the Norse god Freyr, brother to Freyja. The names originally were titles: "lord" or "lady". The oldest meaning of the common word was "(the one) in front; the foremost, the leading" and here in the sense "the island in front of Hitra". Until 1906 the island and municipality name was spelled Frøien (-en is the masculine definite article in Norwegian).

Coat of arms
The coat of arms was granted on 13 March 1987. The official blazon is "Azure, three fishhooks argent in bend". This means the arms have a blue field (background) and the charge is a series of three fish hooks lined up diagonally. The fish hooks have a tincture of argent which means it is commonly colored white, but if it is made out of metal, then silver is used. The fish hooks mimic Stone Age hooks made of bone that are meant to symbolize the importance of fishing and trapping by the people of Frøya. The arms were designed by Einar H. Skjervold based off an idea by S. Hogstad from Kolsås.

Churches
The Church of Norway has one parish within the municipality of Frøya. It is part of the Orkdal prosti (deanery) in the Diocese of Nidaros.

Government
All municipalities in Norway, including Frøya, are responsible for primary education (through 10th grade), outpatient health services, senior citizen services, unemployment and other social services, zoning, economic development, and municipal roads. The municipality is governed by a municipal council of elected representatives, which in turn elect a mayor.  The municipality falls under the Trøndelag District Court and the Frostating Court of Appeal.

Municipal council
The municipal council of Frøya is made up of 23 representatives that are elected to four year terms. The party breakdown of the council is as follows:

Mayor
The mayors of Frøya:

1877–1885: Lars M. Eggen (H) 
1886–1887: Martin Sivertsen (V)
1888–1889: Ivar Meland (V)
1890–1893: Martin Sivertsen (V)
1894–1897: Anton J. Leirvik (V)
1898-1898: Martin Sivertsen (V)
1899–1901: Kristian Sletvold (V)
1902–1905: Martin Sivertsen (V)
(Municipality doesn't exist from 1905-1964)
1964–1967: Johan Rabben (H) 
1968–1971: Georg Larsen (V)
1972–1975: Oskar Steinvik (Ap)
1975-1975: Asbjørn Waagø (Ap)
1976–1979: Jan Iversen (KrF)
1979-1987: Sigbjørn Larsen (KrF)
1987-2003: Jan Otto Fredagsvik (Ap)
2003-2007: Arvid Hammernes (V)
2007-2011: Hans Stølan (Ap)
2011-2019: Berit Flåmo (Ap)
2019–present: Kristin Furunes Strømskag (H)

Geography

The municipality of Frøya has many small fishing communities on the large island of Frøya and many small islands in the ocean such as Mausundvær, Bogøyvær, and Sula, with Mausund being the largest of these with a population of approximately 270. Other small islands such as Froan and Halten, Trøndelag lay to the northeast of the island of Frøya. Many of these islands are home to lighthouses such as Halten Lighthouse, Finnvær Lighthouse, Vingleia Lighthouse, Sula Lighthouse, and Sletringen Lighthouse.

The main island of Frøya is fairly open and has no natural forests–mostly covered with marshes and heather. The largest villages on the island are Sistranda in the east and Titran in the west. Frøya is a member of the International Island Games Association.

Climate
Frøya has a temperate oceanic climate (Cfb) with a year amplitude of only  from the coldest to the warmest month. November and December are the wettest months, while April - July are the driest part of the year. The record high is from July 2014, and the record low is from February 2010. The average date for the last overnight freeze (below ) in spring is April 4  and average date for first freeze in autumn is November 20 (1981-2010 average)  giving an average frost-free season of 229 days.

Notable residents
 John A. Widtsoe (1872 in Frøya – 1952) a Norwegian American, LDS churchman, author, scientist and academic
 Paul Martin Dahlø (1885 in Frøya – 1967) a Norwegian fisherman and politician, Mayor of Frøya on both sides of WWII
 Alf Tande-Petersen (born 1950) a Norwegian TV personality, journalist, writer and businessperson; brought up in Frøya
 Gustav Magnar Witzøe (born 1993 in Frøya) a billionaire and shareholder of salmon fish farming company SalMar ASA

References

External links

Municipal fact sheet from Statistics Norway 

 
Municipalities of Trøndelag
1877 establishments in Norway
1906 disestablishments in Norway
1964 establishments in Norway